Amy Thomson (born October 28, 1958) is an American science fiction writer.  In 1994 she won the John W. Campbell Award for Best New Writer. Most of her work is considered hard science fiction and contains feminist and environmental themes.

Personal life 
Amy Thomson was born in Miami, Florida. She attended college at The University of Idaho and began writing short stories when she moved to Seattle, Washington after graduating. She published her first book, Virtual Girl, in 1993. She is married to Edd Vick.

Bibliography

Novels 
 Virtual girl (1993)
 The color of distance (1995)
 Through alien eyes (1999)
 Storyteller (2003)

Short fiction 

Stories

References

External links
Interview at io9

 

1958 births
Living people
20th-century American novelists
20th-century American women writers
21st-century American novelists
21st-century American women writers
American science fiction writers
American women novelists
Analog Science Fiction and Fact people
Cyberpunk writers
John W. Campbell Award for Best New Writer winners
Women science fiction and fantasy writers